The 2016 Tour of Qatar was a road cycling stage race that took place in Qatar between 8 and 12 February 2016. It was organised by the Amaury Sport Organisation (ASO), the organisers of the Tour de France and was rated as a 2.HC event as part of the 2016 UCI Asia Tour. It was the 15th edition of the Tour of Qatar

The race consisted of five stages. It began in Dukhan and ended in Doha. The Tour of Qatar puts unusual demands on riders: it has no significant climbs, but almost every stage is affected by strong crosswinds. These conditions make the race ideal preparation for the spring classics season, so many prominent classics riders were present. The champion of the 2015 Tour of Qatar was Niki Terpstra, but his team was not invited to the event for disciplinary reasons.

The race was won by Mark Cavendish. This was his second victory, following the 2013 edition. He won Stage 1 and finished second on the second and fifth stages. Alexander Kristoff won three other stages, with Edvald Boasson Hagen winning the time trial but losing time to a puncture on the fourth stage.

Teams 

Eighteen teams were invited to take part in the race. Eight of these were UCI WorldTeams; eight were UCI Professional Continental teams; two were UCI Continental teams. The WorldTeam , which had won eight of the previous ten editions, including the 2015 edition with Niki Terpstra, was not invited. Although Wilfried Peeters, a directeur sportif with the team, had suggested that the team had chosen not to take part for sporting reasons, it was suggested in the days before the race that the president of the Qatar Cycling Federation, Sheikh Khalid Bin Ali Al-Thani, had declined to invite the team because riders had failed to attend podium ceremonies promptly after winning stages in previous editions.

Route

Stages

Stage 1 

8 February – Dukhan to Al Khor Corniche,

Stage 2 

9 February – Doha to Doha,

Stage 3 

10 February – Lusail,  (ITT)

Stage 4 

11 February – Al Zubara Fort to Madinat ash Shamal,

Stage 5

Classification leadership table

References

External links 

 

Tour of Qatar
2016
Tour of Qatar